This is a list of the National Register of Historic Places listings in Summit County, Utah.

This is intended to be a complete list of the properties and districts on the National Register of Historic Places in Summit County, Utah, United States.  Latitude and longitude coordinates are provided for many National Register properties and districts; these locations may be seen together in a map.

There are 111 properties and districts listed on the National Register in the county. Another 3 sites in the county were once listed, but have since been removed.

Of the 111 currently listed in 2019, 87 are in Park City.  Most of these are mining era houses dating from 1872 to 1929;  a 1984 study identified nearly 150 houses of Park City's mining era, of which 104 were either listed or deemed eligible for listing.

The study described the importance of this collection as:
Park City's houses are the largest and best preserved group of residential buildings in a metal mining town in Utah. As such, they provide the most complete documentation of the residential character of mining towns of that period - their settlement patterns, building materials and techniques, and socio-economic make-up. Most of the houses being nominated are small, modest cottages which represent the common folk who made up the majority of the working element of the town, and provide a direct contrast to the majestic houses and large commercial buildings constructed in Salt Lake City for many of the mine owners and officials. The Park City houses are architecturally significant as the largest and best preserved collection of nineteenth and early twentieth century frame houses in Utah; the vast majority of contemporary houses having been constructed of adobe, stone or brick. Documentation of Park City's house types, construction techniques, and building materials has contributed to the understanding of a significant aspect of Utah's architectural development, the late nineteenth century mining community.

These included many examples of each of three main types of homes among its mining era housing.  In 1984 there were 78 extant frame "T/L cottage" or cross-wing type houses in Park City, 17 of which were listed.  Is a T/L cottage one with a T-shaped or L-shaped plan?  These include House at 463 Park Ave. and the Charles Meadowcroft House; a large example is the Dr. William Bardsley House.  How many were "T/L plan by addition"?  There also are a few "L-plan by addition" houses including Alfred Lindorff House.

The second type is the frame pyramid house.  In 1984, there were 69 surviving pyramid houses, 28 of which were nominated for listing.  Of these, 11 were true pyramid houses, including the House at 343 Park Avenue, and 17 were variants.

The third type is the hall and parlor house, of which 76 survived and 22 were nominated, including the Samuel D. Walker House, which is now a two-story example. The Burt Kimball House was a one-story example, was listed but may not have survived.  It was the earliest house type to be built in Park City.

A less common type is the shotgun house:  fewer than 10 examples exist, of which three, including the Frank Hansen House and the House at 1101 Norfolk Avenue, were listed or deemed eligible.



Current listings

|}

Former listings

|}

See also
 List of National Historic Landmarks in Utah
 National Register of Historic Places listings in Utah

References

External links

Summit